The Ferrari Tipo F163 engine is a 3.0-liter, 120°, twin-turbocharged V-6 internal combustion piston engine, made by Ferrari. It is Ferrari's first turbocharged 6-cylinder engine designed and developed for road car use.

Overview

Applications
 Ferrari 296 GTB
 Ferrari 296 GTS
 Ferrari 499P

References

Ferrari engines
Gasoline engines by model
V6 engines